English orthography typically represents vowel sounds with the five conventional vowel letters , as well as , which may also be a consonant depending on context. However, outside of abbreviations, there are a handful of words in English that do not have vowels, either because the vowel sounds are not written with vowel letters or because the words themselves are pronounced without vowel sounds.

Words without written vowels
There are very few lexical words (that is, not counting interjections) without vowel letters. The longest such lexical word is tsktsks, pronounced . The mathematical expression nth , as in delighted to the nth degree, is in fairly common usage. Another mathematical term without vowel letters is ln, the natural logarithm. A more obscure example is rng , derived from ring by deleting the letter . 
Vowelless proper names from other languages, such as the surname Ng, may retain their original spelling, even if they are pronounced with vowels.

This vocalic  generally represented , as in wss ("use"). However at that time the form  was still sometimes used to represent a digraph  (see W), not as a separate letter. This practice exists in modern Welsh orthography so that words borrowed from Welsh may use  this way, such as:
He intricately rhymes, to the music of crwth and pibgorn. in the Welsh alphabet W is a vowel so this word should not be counted.
 cwtch (a hiding place or cubby hole) is also from Welsh (albeit a recent word influenced by English, and used almost exclusively in the variant of English spoken in Wales, not in standard English), and crwth and cwtch are the longest English dictionary words without  according to Collins Dictionary. in the Welsh alphabet W is a vowel so this word should not be counted.
 A cwm (pronounced ) is used in English in a technical geographical or mountaineering context to mean a deep hollow in a mountainous area, usually with steep edges on some sides, like a corrie or cirque, such as the Western Cwm of Mount Everest. It is also sometimes used, by way of more recent borrowing from Welsh, in a more general sense of a valley. The spellings coombe, combe, coomb, and comb come from the Old English cumb, which appears either to be a much earlier borrowing from a predecessor of modern Welsh, or to have an even earlier origin, given that there was an ancient Greek word κὑμβη (kumbē) meaning a hollow vessel. In English literature, one can find the spellings combe (as in Ilfracombe and Castle Combe), coomb (as in J. R. R. Tolkien) or comb (as in Alfred, Lord Tennyson).

There are also numerous vowelless interjections and onomatopoeia found more or less frequently, including brr (brrr is occasionally accepted), bzzt, grrr, hm, hmm, mm, mmm, mhmm, sksksksk, pfft, pht, phpht, psst, sh, shh, zzz.

Alphabetical list of words without vowels A, E, I, O, U: 
B

Brr

Brrr

By(s)

Byrl(s)

Bzzt

C

Ch

Chynd

Cly

Crwth(s)

Cry

Crypt(s)

Cwm(s)

Cyst(s)

D

Dry(ly)(s)

F

Fly

Flyby

Fry

Fy

Fyrd(s)

G

Ghyll(s)

Glycyl(s)

Glyph(s)

Grrl

Grrr

Gyp

Gyppy

Gyp(s)

Gypsy

H

Hm

Hmm

Hwyl(s)

Hymn(s)

Hyp(s)

J

Jynx

K

Ky

L

Lym(s)

Lymph(s)

Lynch

Lyncx

M

Mhmm

Mm

Mmm

My

Myrrh(s)

Myth

N

Nth

Ny(s)

Nymph(ly)(s)

P

Pfft

Ph(s)

Phpht

Pht

Ply

Pry(s)

Psst

Psych

Pygmy

Pyx

R

Rhy

Rhythm(s)

Rng

Rynd(s)

S

Scry

Sh

Shh

Shrthnd

Shy(ly)

Sknch

Sksksksk

Sky

Skyr

Sly(ly)

Spry(ly)

Spy

Sty

Stymy

Swy

Sylph(s)

Syn

Sync(s)

Synch(s)

Synd(s)

T

Thy

Thymy

Try

Tryp(s)

Tryst(s)

Tsk(s)

Tsktsk(s)

Twp

Tyg(s)

Typp(s)

V

Vly

W

Wyn(s)

Wynn

Why(s)

Wry (ly)

Wss

Wych

Wyn

Wynd(s)

Wynn(s)

X

Xlnt

Xylyl(s)

Xyst(s)

Y

Ympt

Z

Zzz

Alphabetical list of words without vowels A, E, I, O, U, and Y. 
B

Brr

Brrr

Bzzt

C

Ch

Crwth(s)

Cwm(s)

Cwtch

G

Grrl

Grrr

H

Hm

Hmm

M

Mhmm

Mm

Mmm

N

Nth

P

Pfft

Ph(s)

Phpht

Pht

Psst

R

Rng

S

Sh

Shh

Sknch

Sksksksk

T

Tsk(s)

Tsktsk(s)

Twp

W

Wss

X

Xlnt

Z

Zzz

Words without vowel sounds
Weak forms of function words may be realized without vowel sounds, as in I can go  and I must sell . Some of these forms are reflected in orthography as contractions, such as s, ll, d, and n't.

See also
 Wiktionary:List of words that comprise a single sound
 
 Words without vowels in other languages

References

Types of words
Vowels
Vowel letters
Lists of English words